Beethaeven "Bee" Scottland (January 11, 1975 – July 1, 2001) was an American professional boxer who competed from 1995 until 2001.

Boxing career
Scottland's career record was 20-7-2, with nine of his victories coming by knockout. By contrast he was only knocked out twice in his career.

Professional boxing record

| style="text-align:center;" colspan="8"|20 Wins (9 knockouts, 11 decisions), 7 Losses,  2 Draws
|-
|align=center style="border-style: none none solid solid; background: #e3e3e3"|Res.
|align=center style="border-style: none none solid solid; background: #e3e3e3"|Record
|align=center style="border-style: none none solid solid; background: #e3e3e3"|Opponent
|align=center style="border-style: none none solid solid; background: #e3e3e3"|Type
|align=center style="border-style: none none solid solid; background: #e3e3e3"|Rd., Time
|align=center style="border-style: none none solid solid; background: #e3e3e3"|Date
|align=center style="border-style: none none solid solid; background: #e3e3e3"|Location
|align=center style="border-style: none none solid solid; background: #e3e3e3"|Notes
|- align=center
|- align=center
|- align=center
|Loss
|20-7-2
|align=left| George Khalid Jones
|
|
|
|align=left|  
|align=left|
|- align=center
|Win
|20–6-2
|align=left| Roosevelt Walker
|
|
|
|align=left|  
|- align=center
|Win
|19-6-2
|align=left| Darren Whitley
|
|
|
|align=left| 
|align=left|
|- align=center
|Loss
|18-6-2
|align=left| Thomas Tate
| 
| 
|
|align=left|
|align=left|
|- align=center
|Win
|18-5-2
|align=left| Jerome Hill
| 
| 
|
|align=left|
|-align=center
|Loss||17–5-2||align=left| Allen Watts
|
|
|
|align=left| 
|align=left|
|-align=center
|Win||17-4-2||align=left| James Mullins
|
|
|
|align=left| 
|align=left|
|-align=center
|Win||16–4-2||align=left| James Mullins
|
|
|
|align=left| 
|align=left|
|-align=center
|Win||15–4-2||align=left| Arnold Fountain
|||||
|align=left| 
|align=left|
|-align=center
|Win||14–4-2||align=left| Jerome Hill
|||||
|align=left| 
|-align=center
|Win||13–4-2||align=left| James Gatlin
|||||
|align=left| 
|align=left|
|-align=center
|Win||12–4-2||align=left| Dennis McKinney
|||||
|align=left| 
|align=left|
|-align=center
|Loss||11–4-2||align=left| John James
|||||
|align=left| 
|align=left|
|-align=center
|Win||11–3-2||align=left| Anthony Harris
|||||
|align=left| 
|align=left|
|-align=center
|Loss||10–3-2||align=left| Eric Harding
|||||
|align=left| 
|align=left|
|-align=center
|Loss||10–2-2||align=left| Eric Harding
|||||
|align=left| 
|align=left|
|-align=center
|Draw||10–1-2||align=left| Bernice Barber
|||||
|align=left| 
|align=left|
|-align=center
|Win||10–1-1||align=left| Ray Healy
||| ||
|align=left| 
|align=left|
|-align=center
|Win||9–1-1||align=left|  Berry Butler
|||||
|align=left| 
|align=left|
|-align=center
|Win||8–1-1||align=left|  Valery Pestovsky
||| ||
|align=left| 
|align=left|
|-align=center
|Win||7–1-1||align=left|  Ron Woodley
||| ||
|align=left| 
|align=left|
|-align=center
|Loss||6–1-1||align=left|  Allen Watts
|||||
|align=left| 
|align=left|
|-align=center
|Draw||6–0-1||align=left| Robert Thomas
|||||
|align=left| 
|align=left|
|-align=center
|Win||6–0||align=left|  Alphonso Dyer
|||||
|align=left| 
|align=left|
|-align=center
|Win||5–0||align=left|  Wes Sivills
|||||
|align=left| 
|align=left|
|-align=center
|Win||4–0||align=left|  Calvin Moody
|||||
|align=left| 
|align=left|
|-align=center
|Win||3–0||align=left|  Ed Bryant
|||||
|align=left| 
|align=left|
|-align=center
|Win||2–0||align=left|  Derrick Stinson
|||||
|align=left| 
|align=left|
|-align=center
|Win||1–0||align=left|  Stan Braxton
|||||
|align=left| 
|align=left|
|-align=center

Death
On June 26, 2001, Scottland stepped in the ring to face George Khalid Jones as part of an ESPN2 telecast from aboard the  museum ship in New York City. Scottland was a late replacement for David Telesco, who at the time was a championship contender who only a year earlier had fought and lost to Roy Jones Jr. for the undisputed championship at light heavyweight.

The overmatched Scottland lasted into the tenth round of the fight, but had been hit with many flush shots from Jones throughout the fight and commentator Max Kellerman, who was calling the fight for ESPN2 that evening, said numerous times on the broadcast that the fight should have been halted prior to the tenth round. Finally, Jones hurt Scottland in the tenth and Scottland dropped to the canvas and was counted out having not risen to his feet. Scottland had to be helped from the ring and fell into a coma, dying from his injuries on July 1, 2001. Referee Arthur Mercante Jr. was criticized in the media for years afterward for allowing Scottland to continue fighting.

Aftermath
Shortly after the fight Jones, who was genuinely affected by Scottland's death, announced that he would be retiring from the ring, feeling responsible for what happened. Denise Scottland, Bee's widow, reached out to Jones and convinced him that her husband would not have wanted him to retire because of him, and to get back into the ring. The two later forged a friendship.

On September 30, 2005, Jones fought Glen Johnson in a bout with the winner to face Clinton Woods for the IBF light heavyweight title. Jones was knocked out in the tenth round.

Scottland was survived by his wife Denise Scottland and four children.

References

External links
 

1975 births
2001 deaths
People from Prince George's County, Maryland
Boxers from Maryland
Deaths due to injuries sustained in boxing
Super-middleweight boxers
Sports deaths in New York (state)
Filmed deaths in sports
American male boxers